Scinax manriquei is a species of frogs in the family Hylidae. It was described in 2004 from Venezuela, the same year as Scinax flavidus was described from Colombia. They are now considered to be synonyms, with Scinax manriquei having the seniority over Scinax flavidus. The species thus defined occurs in the Andean footshills of both Colombia and Venezuela. It has been found in cloud forests as well as in a variety of disturbed habitats.

References

manriquei
Frogs of South America
Amphibians of Colombia
Amphibians of Venezuela
Amphibians described in 2004
Taxa named by Cesar L. Barrio-Amoros